Wysoki may refer to the following places in Poland:

Kolonia Wysoki Małe
Wysoki Bór
Wysoki Duże
Wysoki Garb
Wysoki Grad
Wysoki Kościół
Wysoki Małe
Wysoki Średnie

See also
Osiedle Wysoki Stoczek, Białystok
Wysoki Most (disambiguation)